VZ Camelopardalis is a single, variable star in the northern circumpolar constellation of Camelopardalis. It has a reddish hue and is faintly visible to the naked eye with an apparent visual magnitude that fluctuates around 4.92. The star is located at a distance of approximately 500 light years from the Sun based on parallax, and is drifting further away with a radial velocity of +12 km/s. It was considered a member of the Hyades Supercluster, but in 1990 this was brought into question.

This object is an aging red giant star on the asymptotic giant branch with a stellar classification of M4IIIa. Its variable nature was discovered by American astronomer J. Ashbrook in 1948. This is a suspected slow irregular variable of sub-type Lb that varies in visual magnitude from 4.80 down to 4.96. Long-term photometry measurements suggest there are at least four pulsation periods ranging from 27.1 to 39.0 days. With the supply of hydrogen at its core exhausted the star has cooled and expanded until it has now reached 89 times the radius of the Sun. It is radiating 1,252 times the luminosity of the Sun from its photosphere at an effective temperature of 3,641 K.

References

M-type giants
Asymptotic-giant-branch stars
Slow irregular variables

Camelopardalis (constellation)
Durchmusterung objects
055966
036547|
2742
Camelopardalis, VZ